Sally Lea McCluskey (née Bostwick; April 27, 1941 – March 26, 2022), known by her pen names Bethany Campbell and Lisa Harris, was an American writer of romance novels.

Biography
Sally McCluskey was born on April 27, 1941, in Omaha, Nebraska. She received a B.A. from Wayne State Teachers College, an M.A. in English from the University of Arkansas, and a Ph.D. in English literature from Northern Illinois University, where she met her future husband, Dan Borengasser, a fellow graduate student.

After graduation, she taught at her alma mater and later at Eastern Illinois University. She has also worked on a freelance basis as a writer for several greeting card companies. She published her first romance novel in 1984. She has received three Romance Writers of America RITA Awards, three Romantic Times Reviewer Awards, a Maggie Award, and the Daphne du Maurier Award of Excellence. She died on March 26, 2022, at the age of 80.

Awards
Flirtation River: 1989 Rita Awards Best Novel winner
Every Kind of Heaven: 1992 Rita Awards Best Novel winner
See How They Run: 1997 Rita Awards Best Novel winner

Bibliography

As Bethany Campbell

Single novels
After the Stars Fall,	1985
A Thousand Roses,	1986
Only a Woman,	1986
Heartland,	1987
Pros and Cons,	1987
Sea Promise,	1987
The Long Way Home,	1987
Flirtation River,	1988
The Diamond Trap,	1988
The Lost Moon Flower,	1989
The Snow Garden,	1989
The Roses of Constant,	1989
Dead Opposites,	1990
Heart of the Sun,	1990
The Ends of the Earth,	1990
Dancing Sky,	1990
Every Kind of Heaven,	1991
Every Woman's Dream,	1991
The Cloud Holders,	1991
Spellbinder,	1992
Child's Play,	1992
Sand Dollar,	1992
Only Make Believe,	1992
Add a Little Spice,	1993
The Lady and the Tomcat,	1993
The Man Who Came for Christmas,	1993
Amarillo by Morning,	1993
The Thunder Rolls,	1993
Rhinestone Cowboy,	1994
Gentle on My Mind,	1994
Lonestar State of Mind,	1995
Don't Talk to Strangers,	1996
See How They Run,	1996
Hear No Evil,	1998
The Guardian,	1999
P.S. Love You Madly,	2000
Whose Little Girl Are You?,	2000
The Baby Gift,	2002
A Little Town in Texas,	2003
Home to Texas,	2004
Wild Horses,	2005

Anthologies in collaboration
"Say It with Flowers" in With This Ring,	1991
Always and Forever, 1995 (with Jasmine Cresswell and Debbie Macomber)
"I'll Take Texas" in Return to Crystal Creek,	2002
One True Secret/Full House, 2004 (with Nadia Nichols)
Baby, It's Cold Outside/Family Doctor/Baby Gift, 2004 (with Bobby Hutchinson and Kristine Rolofson)

As Lisa Harris

Single novels
I Will Find You!,	1994
Undercurrent,	1994
Trouble in Paradise,	1994
The Tempting,	1995
A Man from Oklahoma,	1996

References and sources

1941 births
2022 deaths
20th-century American novelists
21st-century American novelists
American romantic fiction writers
RITA Award winners
Writers from Omaha, Nebraska
American women novelists
Women romantic fiction writers
20th-century American women writers
21st-century American women writers